Biastes is a genus of bees belonging to the family Apidae.

The species of this genus are found in Europe.

Species:
 Biastes brevicornis (Panzer, 1798) 
 Biastes emarginatus (Schenck, 1853)

References

Apidae